Rita Hayworth and Shawshank Redemption is a novella by Stephen King from his 1982 collection Different Seasons, subtitled Hope Springs Eternal. The novella has also been published as a standalone short book. The story is entirely told by the character Red, in a narrative he claims to have been writing from September 1975 to January 1976, with an additional chapter added in spring 1977.

It was adapted for the screen by Frank Darabont in 1994 as The Shawshank Redemption, which was nominated for seven Academy Awards in 1994, including Best Picture. In 2009, it was adapted for the stage as The Shawshank Redemption.

Plot 
In 1947, in Maine, Andy Dufresne, a banker, is tried and convicted of the double murder of his wife and her lover, despite his claims of innocence. He is sent to Shawshank State Penitentiary to serve a double life sentence. There, he meets Red, a prisoner who is known in the prison for his ability to smuggle in contraband items. Andy asks Red to get him a rock hammer, which he uses to shape rocks he collects from the exercise yard into small sculptures. He later requests a large poster of Rita Hayworth, which he hangs on the wall above his bed.

Over the years, Andy uses his financial knowledge to assist various prison staff.  

In October 1967, Andy tells Red about “Peter Stevens”, a pseudonym under which Andy had sold off his assets and invested the proceeds. Andy tells Red that one day "Peter Stevens" will own a small seaside resort hotel in Zihuatanejo, Mexico.

On the morning of March 12, 1975, after 28 years in prison, Andy disappears from his locked cell. After a search, warden Samuel Norton discovers that the poster pasted to Andy’s cell wall covers a man-sized hole – Andy had used his rock hammer to slowly chip a tunnel through the wall. In September 1975, Red receives a blank postcard from McNary, Texas, a tiny town near the Mexican border, and surmises that Andy crossed the border there. 

In March 1977, Red is paroled. He finds a letter wrapped in plastic addressed to him from "Peter Stevens" inviting him to join Andy in Mexico and $1,000 in cash. The story ends with Red preparing to break his parole and follow Andy to Mexico.

Adaptation
The novella has been adapted into a film, The Shawshank Redemption, starring Tim Robbins as Andy, and Morgan Freeman as Red, and a play of the same name. The film version is considered one of the most celebrated movies of all time, being nominated for seven Oscars at the 67th Academy Awards in 1995, including Best Picture and Best Actor for Freeman. Morgan Freeman stated in an interview that this novella is his favorite book.

See also
 Stephen King short fiction bibliography

References

External links

Short stories by Stephen King
American short stories
1982 American novels
Novels set in prison
Wrongful convictions in fiction
Fiction set in 1948
Fiction set in 1951
Fiction set in 1963
Fiction set in 1975
Fiction set in 1977
Novels set in Maine